The 1993–94 Kuwaiti Premier League was contested by 8 teams, and Kazma Sporting Club won the championship.

Group stage

Group A

Group B

Championship Playoffs

Third place match
Al Jahra 1-1 (pen 5-4) Al Arabi Kuwait

Final
Kazma Sporting Club 2-0 Al Qadisiya Kuwait

References

1994
Kuw
1